David Nelson (born 1996) is an American Republican politician from Alaska. He has represented the 15th as a member of the Alaska House of Representatives since 2021.

Early life and education 
Nelson was born in Orlando, Florida, and raised in Sanford, Florida. He earned a Bachelor of Arts degree in political science from University of Alaska Anchorage in 2018. During college, he was a member of the Junior Reserve Officers' Training Corps.

Career 
After graduating from college, Nelson was commissioned as a second lieutenant in the Alaska Army National Guard. He serves as a CBRN officer for in 207th Aviation Regiment at Joint Base Elmendorf–Richardson. Nelson has also worked as a defense contractor and as the president of the Mid-Town Rotary Club of Anchorage. He was elected to the Alaska House of Representatives in November 2020 and assumed office on January 19, 2021.

References

External links 
 Official website/
 David Nelson at Ballotpedia

1996 births
Living people
Republican Party members of the Alaska House of Representatives
21st-century American politicians
University of Alaska Anchorage alumni